A judiciary committee is a committee of a legislative body that considers issues related to the legal system. It may refer to:

 United States House Committee on the Judiciary, a standing committee of the United States House of Representatives
 United States Senate Committee on the Judiciary, a standing committee of the United States Senate

See also 
 Council of the judiciary
 Judicial Council (disambiguation)
 National Judicial Council (disambiguation)